This is a list of launches performed by Ariane carrier rockets between 1990 and 1999. The Ariane 4 was in service throughout this period, and conducted most launches, with the Ariane 5 making its first four flights in the second half of the decade.

Launch statistics

Rocket configurations

Launch outcomes

Launch history

See also

References